Jürgen Melzer was the defending champion. He successfully defended his last year's title by beating Lucky loser and his compatriot, Andreas Haider-Maurer 6–7(10–12), 7–6(7–4), 6–4 in the final match.

Seeds
The top four seeds received a bye into the second round.

Draw

Finals

Top half

Bottom half

References
 Main Draw
 Qualifying Draw

Bank Austria-TennisTrophy - Singles
2010 - Singles